Travis Scott (born September 14, 1975) is a Canadian former professional ice hockey goaltender who played in one National Hockey League (NHL) game with the Los Angeles Kings during the 2000–01 season. He played most of his first nine professional seasons, from 1996 to 2005, in the American Hockey League (AHL) and East Coast Hockey League (ECHL). He spent the last six seasons of his career, 2005 to 2011, in Europe, playing in the Russian Superleague, the German Deutsche Eishockey Liga, the Austrian Hockey League, and the Kontinental Hockey League (KHL).

Career statistics

Regular season and playoffs

See also
 List of players who played only one game in the NHL

References

External links
 

1975 births
Living people
Baton Rouge Kingfish players
Canadian expatriate ice hockey players in Austria
Canadian expatriate ice hockey players in Germany
Canadian expatriate ice hockey players in Russia
Canadian ice hockey goaltenders
EC KAC players
Hannover Scorpions players
Ice hockey people from Ottawa
Kölner Haie players
Los Angeles Kings players
Lowell Lock Monsters players
Manchester Monarchs (AHL) players
Metallurg Magnitogorsk players
Mississippi Sea Wolves players
Nepean Raiders players
Oshawa Generals players
San Antonio Rampage players
Traktor Chelyabinsk players
Undrafted National Hockey League players
Windsor Spitfires players
Worcester IceCats players